The George Washington and the Revolutionary War Door (1855–1868) is pair of a bronze sculptured doors to the Senate wing of the United States Capitol in Washington, D.C., United States. American sculptor Thomas Crawford designed and modeled the doors in the mid-1850s, but died prior to their completion. American sculptor William H. Rinehart completed the doors based on Crawford's designs.

This sculptured door was surveyed in 1993 as part of the Smithsonian's Save Outdoor Sculpture! program.

Description
These two elaborate doors consist of six panels depicting activities and events associated with George Washington during the American Revolution.

The carved panels on the left, from top to bottom, depict:
 the laying of the United States Capitol cornerstone, 1793
 First inauguration of George Washington as President, 1789
 ovation for George Washington at Trenton, New Jersey, 1789
 an allegorical Peace and Agriculture

On the right side, from top to bottom, they depict:
 the Battle of Bunker Hill and death of General Joseph Warren, 1775
 Battle of Monmouth, 1778
 the Battle of Yorktown
 and an allegory of a Hessian soldier and Yankee

History
Crawford designed the doors in Rome between 1855 and 1857. Crawford died in 1857 with the modelling substantially complete.  Models were created with the assistance of fellow sculptor William H. Rinehart for casting at the Ames Manufacturing Company from 1864 to 1868, when the finished doors were installed.

Crawford created a companion set of bronze doors for the House wing of the Capitol, the Revolutionary War Door.  

In 1993 the door was analyzed by art conservators from the Save Outdoor Sculpture! survey program and was described as well-maintained.

See also
 List of public art in Washington, D.C., Ward 6

Further reading

Allen, William C. History of the United States Capitol: A Chronicle of Design, Construction, and Politics. Architect of the Capitol, 2001. 
Wood, James M. Washington Sculpture. Johns Hopkins Press, 2008.

References

1868 establishments in Washington, D.C.
1868 sculptures
American Revolutionary War monuments and memorials
Bronze sculptures in Washington, D.C.
George Washington in art
Bronze doors
United States Capitol art
Sculptures of men in Washington, D.C.